Stanley Moorhouse (fourth ¼ – 23 April 1951) was an English professional rugby league footballer who played in the 1900s, 1910s and 1920s.

Background
Stan Moorhouse's birth was registered in Huddersfield, West Riding of Yorkshire, England, and he died aged 59 in Almondbury, Huddersfield, West Riding of Yorkshire, England.

Playing career

International honours
Moorhouse won caps for England while at Huddersfield in 1912 against Wales, in 1913 against Wales, in 1914 against Wales. He equalled the record for the most tries scored in an England match, with four against Wales at South Devon Place, Plymouth on Saturday 15 February 1913.

Moorhouse also won caps for Great Britain while at Huddersfield when he was selected to go on the 1914 Great Britain Lions tour of Australia and New Zealand.

County Cup Final appearances
Stan Moorhouse played , i.e. number 5, and scored a try in Huddersfield's 22–10 victory over Hull Kingston Rovers in the 1911 Yorkshire County Cup Final during the 1911–12 season at Belle Vue, Wakefield on Saturday 25 November 1911, played , i.e. number 5, and scored a try in the 31–0 victory over Hull F.C. in the 1914 Yorkshire County Cup Final during the 1914–15 season at Headingley Rugby Stadium, Leeds on Saturday 28 November 1914, and played , i.e. number 2, and scored a 4-tries in the 24–5 victory over Leeds in the 1919 Yorkshire County Cup Final during the 1919–20 season at Thrum Hall, Halifax on Saturday 29 November 1919. The record for the most tries in a Yorkshire County Cup Final is 4-tries, and is jointly held by; Stan Moorhouse, Alan Smith and Stanley Smith.

Testimonial match
A joint benefit season/testimonial match at Huddersfield for; Stan Moorhouse and Arthur Swinden took place during the 1921–22 season, including the match against Hull F.C. at Fartown Ground, Huddersfield on Saturday 1 April 1922.

References

External links
Photograph "Stanley Moorhouse - Former Huddersfield renowned winger, Stanley Moorhouse, turned out for Northern in the 1923/24 season. - Date: 01/01/1923" at rlhp.co.uk

1891 births
1951 deaths
Bradford Bulls players
England national rugby league team players
English rugby league players
Great Britain national rugby league team players
Huddersfield Giants players
Rugby league players from Huddersfield
Rugby league wingers
Yorkshire rugby league team players